Jaline Prado de Oliveira (born 27 December 1979, Campos) is a Brazilian volleyball player who played in the European Women's Volleyball Leagues.

Playing career 
She participated at the 2011–12 Women's CEV Cup, with Chateau d'Ax Urbino.

Clubs

References

External links 

http://www.cev.lu/competition-area/PlayerDetails.aspx?TeamID=479&PlayerID=28381&ID=28
http://www.legavolleyfemminile.it/?page_id=194&idat=PRA-JAL
http://gazettesports.fr/2016/07/20/la-force-bresilienne-en-nouvelle-recrue/

1979 births
Living people
Brazilian women's volleyball players
People from Campos dos Goytacazes
Sportspeople from Rio de Janeiro (state)